Repejov is a village and municipality in the Medzilaborce District in the Prešov Region of far north-eastern Slovakia.

History
In historical records the village was first mentioned in 1454.

Geography
The municipality lies at an altitude of 280 metres and covers an area of 18.324 km². It has a population of about 165 people.

References

External links
 
http://www.statistics.sk/mosmis/eng/run.html

Villages and municipalities in Medzilaborce District